Employee voice refers to the participation of employees in influencing organizational decision-making. Decision-making by managers an influence their creativity. The process is going very personal to the managers and what they believe will be beneficial for everyone. The creativity of one person's view can change the dynamic of a project. Having personal views is what allows them to make decisions for the better. [1]Research shows that your analysis has grown around the voice concept in a variety of disciplines, ‘employee voice’ has become an elastic term meaning somewhat different things to a different policy, academic, and practitioner actors. In the many disciplines that cover voice, such as human resource management, political science, economics, organizational behavior, psychology, or law, perspectives toward the concept differ. Drawing on Dundon et al. voice can be seen with different lenses, "communication theory is one that insists on a communication process that values dialogue, listening and mutual trust." First, voice is an articulation of individual dissatisfaction or concern that aims to address a specific problem or issue with management. Second, the voice takes the form of a collective organization, where the voice provides a countervailing source of power to management. Third, there is the role of voice as a contribution to management decision-making. Here the purpose is to gain employee input to improve work organization and efficiency more generally, perhaps through quality circles or teamwork or eliciting workforce engagement. Fourth, voice can be seen as an instrument for mutual gain, with productive collaboration between capital and labor increasing the long-term viability of an organization and the economic well-being of employees.

The editors of the Elgar Handbook of Employee Voice define employee voice as the ways and means through which employees attempt to have a say and potentially influence organizational affairs about issues that affect their work and the interests of managers and owners. This definition combines a variety of voice mechanisms that analysts often group in separate boxes (e.g. involvement or bargaining; union and non-union). It allows for employer implemented Non-union Employee Representative (NER) systems as a collective form of voice, be it chosen to marginalize a union presence or to provide an alternative to union influence. In general, employee voice is about how employees are able to have a say over work activities and decisions within the organizations in which they work, regardless of the institutional channel through which it operates—whether through speak-up programs, quality circles, teamwork, or collective negotiation.

Arguments for employee voice can be both moral and political as well as economic. There is a wide range of mechanisms related to employee voice, and these may be direct or indirect, formal or informal, and power-centered or task-centered. As well as trade union representation, the voice may refer to a wide array of techniques including Empowerment, Employee Engagement, and Team working initiatives. In reality, many employers adopt a blend of voice mechanisms. However, some employers may also wish to limit employee voice, believing instead that the best approach is for management to command and control the organization. Equally, some employees may not want to have their voices heard, or may not want to express their thoughts.

Informal and formal mechanisms 
Employee voice is attained through both informal and formal mechanisms. Informal employee voice mechanisms include a general conversation between employees and employers, email communication, employee feedback, social functions, and meetings at the workplace. Informal communication is based on social relationships among people (Anderson & Narus, 1984; Litterst & Eyo, 1982; Guffy, Rhoddes, & Rogin, 2005). Specifically, the origin of informal communication is “employees’ private purposes” while the foundation of formal communication is supposed to serve the “purposes of the corporation” (Ogaard, Marnburg, & Larsen, 2008). Employees can also influence corporate decision-making through their actions, such as turnover and absenteeism.

Formal mechanisms include communication tools implemented by an organization's human resource department, such as employee surveys and suggestion boxes. Having your employees feel like they are making changes, they will feel wanted and needful of the job [2]. Some organizations promote employee voice through financial participation, such as share ownership and profit-sharing opportunities. Employee ownership trusts, employee consultative committees, and representation through trade unions are also formal ways of ensuring employees are informed and are given a voice in decisions that affect their employment.

There is also a whole new type of manager that people do not necessarily know the term but perform on a day-to-day operation this is called distance Managers. This allows the employee to take on a task that might be found difficult to come over but allows them to feel a part of change within the work environment, this takes part while managers are distancing themselves from the operation to allow them to feel on their own but know they can also ask for help. [3] Allowing employees or any type of person in any situation to take charge without stepping in first brings out the best of both worlds. You are able to understand every point of view without having to dig into the books of studying each situation and outcome [4]. Although studying books is a very important way of learning, leaders learn more from experience and their team's behavior[5].

Encouraging employee voice 
Various factors influence the willingness of employees to voice a dissenting opinion. Besides individual characteristics and the nature of the work performed, employees' voice decisions are also thought to be shaped by their expectations regarding whether their use of voice will be successful and whether they may be disciplined for it. Research from public administration shows that recruiting personnel on the basis of merit encourages employee voice. As well as formal communication, informal communication also plays an inevitable role in organizational life (Crampton, Hodge, & Mishra, 1998). According to Homans (1951), the existence of an informal system in an organization is unavoidable because employees resist being treated as means to an end, and they interact as a whole, bringing with them their own problems and purposes that give rise to spontaneous behavior that seek to control their condition of work

European Works Councils 
In an international context, the role of employee voice varies immensely. The European model is fundamentally based on employee communication and consultation between employees and corporate management. European Works Councils were introduced through the European Directive 1994 to accommodate these goals and provided employees with an opportunity to gain access to senior levels of their employers. The European model has required amendments to improve its effectiveness in managing employee voice and legal compliance.

See also 
 Works council
 Public participation (decision making)
 Exit, Voice, and Loyalty (book by Hirschman)

Notes

References

 Davis, E,M, Lansbury, R,D (1996), Managing Together: Consultation and Participation in the Workplace, Longman, Australia
.T. Dundon, A. Wilkinson, M. Marchington and P. Ackers (2004) The Meaning and Purpose of Employee Voice, International Journal of Human Resource Management, Vol. 15, No. 6, 2004, pp. 1149-1170.	
Johnstone, S and Ackers, P (2015), Finding a Voice at Work? New Perspectives on Employment Relations, Oxford, Oxford University Press
 McLean, P (2008), Employee Voice, MGMT341, International and Comparative Human Resource Management, University of Wollongong, delivered 19 August 2008
 Stone, R (2005), Human Resource Management, 5th edition, John Wiley & Sons, Queensland
 Timming, A (2007), ‘European Works Councils and the Dark Side of Managing Worker Voice’, Human Resource Management Journal, Vol.17, Iss.3, pp. 248–254
Wilkinson, A, Donaghey, J, Dundon, T and Freeman, R (eds) 2014, The Handbook of Research on Employee Voice Cheltenham, Edward Elgar Press.
Wilkinson, A, Gollan, P, Marchington, M and Lewin, D (eds) 2010, The Oxford Handbook of Participation in Organizations, Oxford University Press, Oxford.

Labor relations